Kartar Singh Tanwar (born 1962) is an Indian politician and a member of the Sixth Legislative Assembly of Delhi. He represents the Chhatarpur constituency of New Delhi and is a member of the Aam Aadmi Party political party.

Early life and education
Kartar Singh Tanwar was born in New Delhi. A Gurjar by caste, he attended the G. B. Pant Polytechnic and attained a Diploma in engineering.

Political career
Tanwar is a MLA for second term. He represented the Chhatarpur constituency and is a member of the Aam Aadmi Party political party. Before joining AAP in 2014, he was a leader with the Bharatiya Janata Party (BJP). His political career, however, started way back in 2007, when he became the corporator for the Bhati ward (two terms). Before taking the plunge into politics, Tanwar was a junior engineer with the Delhi Jal Board (DJB).

On 27 July 2016, the Income Tax department raided Tanwar's home, office, farmhouse along with his brother Chatar Singh's residence. Tanwar had submitted an affidavit in 2015 to the Election Commission of India showing only  of total assets.

Electoral performance

References 
 

1962 births
Aam Aadmi Party politicians from Delhi
Delhi MLAs 2015–2020
Delhi MLAs 2020–2025
Living people
People from South Delhi district